The  was the 2020 (Reiwa 2) edition of NHK's television special Kōhaku Uta Gassen, held on December 31, 2020, live from NHK Hall (Tokyo, Japan), and broadcast in Japan through NHK General Television and NHK Radio 1, and worldwide through TV Japan (US only) and NHK World Premium.

This was the first edition in history in which the special was broadcast without a studio audience due to the ongoing COVID-19 pandemic.  The audience was replaced with off-venue voting, in which votes determined the winning team for this event. This was the last edition until 2022 to be held in the NHK Hall as the venue will close for renovations and earthquake-proofing, which is scheduled to end some time in June 2022; the next edition will take place at the Tokyo International Forum.

The  won the edition for the first time since 2016, four years prior.

Events leading up to broadcast 
Unless otherwise stated, all events in the article reflects the current year of 2020.
On September 10, NHK chairman Terunobu Maeda announced that the edition will be closed-door due to the COVID-19 pandemic, a first in history for the Kōhaku Uta Gassen. The special was also delayed by 15 minutes till 7.45pm.
On November 2, NHK announced Teruyoshi Uchimura and Maho Kuwako as the show's moderators, the latter returning after a year's absence and replacing Mayuko Wakuda on her behalf; Fumi Nikaido and Yo Oizumi were the team leaders for the Red and White teams, respectively. The theme for that season is "今こそ歌おう みんなでエール" (lit. "Everyone Let's Sing and Yell Together"; Ima koso utaou min'na de ēru)
On November 16, NHK announced the performers; nine performers making their debut this season including Sakurazaka46, Juju, Tokyo Jihen, NiziU, Babymetal, Milet, SixTones and Snow Man. Music group Greeeen also performed in the opening.
On December 12, Yumi Matsutoya announced she would step down from the Red team and be performing a special song, "Mamotte Agetai".
On December 13, Ryota Yamasato and Naomi Watanabe were revealed as hosts for the special.
On December 14, Masashi Sada was announced to appear in one of the Specials; this is Sada's first appearance after a 13-year hiatus since 2007, and the 22nd artist to have surpass 20 Kōhaku Uta Gassen appearances.
On December 21, the song lists for the performers were unveiled.
On December 23, Yoasobi also announced their debut with the new song "Yoru ni Kakeru", marking the first instance the performer making their debut was not involved physically.
On December 24, Snow Man announces their withdrawal from the show after one of the members for the band, Ryota Miyadate, was tested positive for COVID-19. This is the first time since the 22nd edition, 49 years prior, where a withdrawal of performances occurred, also due to health reasons (Hiroshi Uchiyamada and Cool Five's singer Kiyoshi Maekawa was ill and was replaced by Keiko Fuji on one of the performances). Snow Man could have performed "D.D." alongside SixTones on the first half.
On December 28, the order of performances was unveiled.
On December 30, rehearsals were underway. One singer, Kōji Tamaki, revealed his song lineup "Den-en" to be performed as a special on the second half of the show; this is Tamaki's first Special performance since the 47th event in 1996, 24 years prior.

Show highlights and other statistics
Hiroshi Miyama set a world record for the most players involved in a Kendama playing, with 125 (including host Oizumi), surpassing the previous record of 124 in the 2018 event two years ago. This was the fourth consecutive year Miyama had attempted to achieve a world record, hence the subtitle "Round 4", and the second consecutive year with 125 performers after the failure on last year.
This is Arashi's final involvement in Kōhaku Uta Gassen after 12 consecutive years of appearance due to the band taking a hiatus announced on January 27, 2019.
NiziU became the fastest artist/group to have appeared in a Kōhaku Uta Gassen since their debut on December 2, 29 days ago (the previous holder was WaT in the 2002's edition, appearing in just 1 month and 29 days after their debut).
Veteran singer Hiroshi Itsuki became the second performer to have made more than 50 appearances in Kōhaku Uta Gassen (the first being Saburō Kitajima who achieved this distinction in 2013) and the first performer to appear 50 times consecutively.
This event marked the first time AKB48 or even one of the AKB48 Group groups didn't appear on Kōhaku Uta Gassen, breaking their 10-year streak of 12 appearances, although they didn't appear on the 2008 edition. Only Sakamichi Series groups were there present for this edition.
This is Babymetal's only appearance to date at the event, due to the band taking a hiatus as announced on October 10, 2021.
This is also the first time that both of Amuse's biggest properties (Perfume and Babymetal) performed together at the event, in back to back performances (Perfume at 21, Babymetal at 22).

Personnel

Presenters
 Red Team: Fumi Nikaido
 White Team: Yo Oizumi
 Moderators: Teruyoshi Uchimura & Maho Kuwako
 Narrators: Naoyuki Tamura & Nonoka Akaki

Judges
Tetsuko Kuroyanagi- current judge for NHK Kōhaku Uta Gassen
Sandwichman (Mikio Date and Takeshi Tomizawa)- Comedian duo
Hana Sugisaki- "Ochoyan" lead actress
Shōta Sometani- "Kirin ga Kuru" second lead actor
Chicko- Chico Will Scold You! main voice actor
Yoshiko Miyazaki- actress
Amon Miyamoto- musical director
Koji Murofushi- sports athlete
Ryo Yoshizawa- "Seiten wo Tsuke" lead actor

Guests
Additional crew

Artist lineup
 Performers

Voting system and results
Voting is conducted after all the performances, and unlike the past two editions, the winning team is determined by the votes cast, due to a change in the voting format as a result of the COVID-19 pandemic. The Red Team was announced the winner in a 2,635,200-1,383,180 vote.

References

Citations

Notes

External links

NHK Kōhaku Uta Gassen events
2020 in Japanese music
2020 in Japanese television